Peter Vaughan Elsmere McClintock (born 17 October 1940, in Omagh, Northern Ireland) is notable for his scientific work on superfluids and stochastic nonlinear dynamics.

Education
He received the B.Sc. degree in physics in 1962 and the D.Sc. degree from Queen's University, Belfast, Northern Ireland.
He completed his D.Phil. at Oxford University in 1966, under Harold Max Rosenberg, with a thesis entitled Experiments on Spin Phonon Interactions in the area of paramagnetic crystals at very low temperatures.

Career
He performed postdoctoral research on superfluid helium at Duke University, Durham, North Carolina. He joined Lancaster University, UK, in 1968, where he is now a Professor of Physics. His research interests  span superfluid helium-4, medical physics, and stochastic nonlinear dynamics. The particular sub-topics are: (a) magnetism including, especially, studies of spin-phonon interactions in rare-earth ethylsulphate crystals; (b) quantum fluids and liquid helium-4 in particular; (c) nonlinear dynamics and fluctuational phenomena including applications to physiology. Since 2009, he is the Editor-in-Chief of Fluctuation and Noise Letters.

Honors
McClintock is a Fellow of the Institute of Physics.

Books by McClintock
 Aneta Stefanovska and P. V. E. McClintock (Eds.), Physics of Biological Oscillators: New Insights into Non-Equilibrium and Non-Autonomous Systems, Springer, 2021.
 Frank Moss and P. V. E. McClintock (Eds.), Noise in Nonlinear Dynamical Systems, Cambridge University Press, 1989, .
 P. V. E. McClintock, D. J. Meredith and J. K. Wigmore, Low-Temperature Physics: An Introduction for Scientists and Engineers, Blackie, 1992, .
 P. V. E. McClintock, D. J. Meredith and J. K. Wigmore, Matter at Low Temperatures, Blackie, 1984, .

Notes

External links

McClintock homepage

1940 births
Living people
People from Omagh
Alumni of the University of Oxford
Alumni of Queen's University Belfast
Physicists from Northern Ireland
Probability theorists
Academics of Lancaster University
Rare earth scientists
British expatriates in the United States